Permyakov is a Russian masculine surname, its feminine counterpart is Permyakova. It may refer to
Olga Permyakova (born 1982), Russian ice hockey defender
Vladimir Permyakov (born 1952), Russian actor
Yakov Permyakov (died 1712), Russian seafarer, explorer, merchant and Cossack

Russian-language surnames